Chapel en le Frith was a rural district in Derbyshire, England, from 1894 to 1974. It was named after the town of Chapel-en-le-Frith and created under the Local Government Act 1894.

The district was abolished in 1974 under the Local Government Act 1972 and combined with various other local government districts in northern Derbyshire to form the new High Peak district.

References

Districts of England created by the Local Government Act 1894
Districts of England abolished by the Local Government Act 1972
History of Derbyshire
Rural districts of England